The Colle della Rho (in Italian) or Col de la Roue (in French) is a mountain col at , at the border between the massif des Cerces and the Cottian Alps.

Toponymy 
The col was named in Latin Collis Rotae (literally Col of the Wheel), the same meaning of its present-day French name, Col de la Roue. On the official Italian maps at the beginning of the 20th century was added a "h" to an old name of the col, Colle della Rô, turning it in Colle della Rhô. Later on, the circumflex accent was lost, ending up in Colle della Rho, the present-day most common Italian name of the col. However, on some editions of the Italian official maps of IGM and on the technical map adopted by the Regione Piemonte the circumflex accent still appears.

History 

The Colle della Rho, during antiquity, was one of the most frequented connections between Susa Valley and Maurienne; close to it some Roman coins have been found. 
From the Middle Ages on, several battles and skirmish occurred on the pass, which was located at first on the border between Dauphiné and Savoy (up to the Peace of Utrecht, 1713) and later, from 1860 on, between France and Italy. The last fights near the col were connected to the Italian invasion of France (June 1940).

Geography 
The pass is located on the border between France and Italy. It connects, from South to North, Bardonecchia (Italy) to Modane (France). It consists in a wide saddle between the Gran Bagna (3,083 m, SW of the pass) and the Roc de Jany (2,657 m, East), a satellite summit of the Punta Nera (3,047 m). 
The path over the mountain pass is not paved. It can be reached by mountain bike.

References

See also

 France–Italy border
 List of mountain passes

Mountain passes of the Alps
Roue
Mountain passes of Piedmont
Metropolitan City of Turin
France–Italy border crossings
Landforms of Savoie
Transport in Auvergne-Rhône-Alpes